Event data may refer to:
Events within an Event-driven architecture
Events handled by Event stream processing
Events handled by Complex event processing
Records within an Audit trail